Armour is a surname. Notable people with the surname include:

Adam Armour (born 2002), American soccer player
Andrew Watson Armour III (1908–1991), Armour and Company president, relative of Philip Danforth Armour
Andy Armour (1883–1955), Scottish footballer
Anthony Armour (born 1982), Australian rugby player
Aviva Armour-Ostroff, Canadian actress, writer and filmmaker
Bill Armour (1869-1922), American baseball player and manager
Buddy Armour (1915-1974), American baseball player
Carlos Armour (born 1986), American gridiron football player
David Armour (born 1954), Australian rules footballer
Davie Armour (1953-2004), Scottish football player
Edward Armour Peck
G. Armour Craig
George Armour (1812–1881), Scottish American businessman and philanthropist
George Denholm Armour (1864–1949), Scottish painter and illustrator
Hazel Armour (1894-1985),Scottish sculptor and medalist
Heda Armour (1914-1996), British painter and etcher
Herman Armour Webster American etcher water colorist
Herman Ossian Armour (1837–1901), co-founder of Armour and Company
J. Ogden Armour (1863-1927), American meatpacking magnate
James Armour Johnstone
James Armour (1841-1928), Irish Presbyterian minister and political activist 
James Armour (1731-1798), Master mason
Jean Armour Polly
Jean Armour (1765–1834), known as the "Belle of Mauchline" wife of the Scottish poet, Robert Burns.
Jennifer Armour (born 1985), American actress
Jesse Armour Crandall (1834-1920), 
JoJuan Armour (born 1976), American gridiron football player
Jody Armour
John Armour (born 1971), British legal scholar
John Douglas Armour (1830-1903), Canadian judge
Johnny Armour (born 1968), English boxer
Julian Armour (born 1960), Canadian cellist and artistic director
Justin Armour (born 1973), American football player
Leslie Armour (1931-2004), was a Canadian-born philosopher and writer on social economics 
Lester Armour III
Margaret Armour (1860–1943), Scottish poet and translator
Marion Armour, Scottish female curler
Mary Nicol Neill Armour (1902-2000), British artist
Matthew Armour (1820-1903), was a radical Free Church of Scotland minister on the island of Sanday, Orkney
Neil Armour (born 1967), Scottish football player
Norman Armour (1887-1982), American diplomat
Philip Danforth Armour (1832–1901), meatpacker and businessman, founder of Armour and Company
Rebecca Agatha Armour (1845-1891), Canadian teacher and novelist
Richard Armour (1906–1989), American author and poet
Robert Armour (1781-1857), Canadian businessman, militia officer, and office holder
Roger Armour (1934-2020), British vascular surgeon and inventor
Ryan Armour (born 1976), American golfer
Sid Armour, Canadian make-up artist
Stanley Armour Dunham (1918-1992), Maternal grandfather of Barack Obama And JJ Green
Thomas Armour (1890-1963), was a bishop in the Anglican Church of Australia
Tommy Armour III (born 1959), American golfer
Tommy Armour (1896-1968), American golfer
Vernice Armour (born 1973), United States Marine Corps pilot
Wal Armour (1921-1995), Australian rules footballer
William Allan Armour (1880-1967), New Zealand school principal and educationalist

Scottish surnames